is a Konami video game that was first released for a Japan-exclusive market in 1988 for the Family Computer Disk System. It was later released as a cartridge in 1993 for the Family Computer itself.

It was released on the Wii's Virtual Console in Japan on June 3, 2008, in North America on June 9, 2008, and in Europe on August 29, 2008. It was released for the Nintendo 3DS's Virtual Console in Japan on February 19, 2014, it was also released for the Wii U's Virtual Console in Japan on July 15, 2015. The Wii Virtual Console release was the only official release of the game outside Japan.

Story
"Upa is the prince of a magical kingdom and the most recent in a line of brave fighters. One day, though, he broke an urn containing the spirit of Zai, an incredibly evil goatish demon who takes the life force of the kingdom's adults and kidnaps all the babies - except for Upa, who is given a magical rattle by a fairy who was trapped in the urn along with Zai. And so, in order to save his kingdom, Upa crawls into action..."

Gameplay

Bio Miracle Bokutte Upas main character is a baby called Upa that uses a rattle to attack his enemies. When injured by the rattle, the enemy inflates and floats away. These inflated enemies can then be used as temporary floating platforms to climb to higher places or they can also be used as weapons if pushed in any direction. If used as a platform, Upa must not stay on top for too long or otherwise it will explode. But if used as a weapon, Upa has to pounce or use his rattle on the inflated enemy to cause it to careen. The enemy will then ricochet off objects and potentially cause damage to both the protagonist and other enemies if it comes in contact with them.

The game uses a health meter to monitor the player's remaining life which can be replenished by obtaining bottles of milk scattered throughout the levels. A heart icon can also be obtained, increasing the maximum health by one unit for the duration of the current world.

Most items, including the milk bottles and hearts, can be collected by striking special blocks which feature Upa's face. Other items include: Apples, which increase the player's score; hourglasses, which temporarily freeze enemies in place; bells, which give Upa temporary invincibility and the ability to run; and scorpion blocks, which kill all enemies on-screen when they are pushed off a platform and hit the ground.

Release history

Cartridge version
In 1993, it was released as a cartridge for the Famicom itself. While it is practically identical to the Disk System version of the game, there are a few differences.

The most notable difference is the game's sound. The Family Computer Disk System contained an extra audio channel not available in the Family Computer/NES games. To compensate for the missing audio channel, the music in the Family Computer cartridge version had to be remixed. Also, a difficulty option was added to the Famicom.

Additionally, the player is given a choice between an "Easy" mode, where enemy damage is reduced and the player starts with more lives, and a "Normal" mode, which is the same difficulty as the original FDS version.

Finally, among the smallest of alterations to the game is the title screen, which no longer contains a large image of Upa when it is first displayed.

Chinese version
An unlicensed version for the Famicom was released in China under the name Crayon Xiao xin (蠟筆小新 Làbǐ xiǎo xīn, Crayon Shin-chan'''s Chinese title), in which the playable character is replaced with Shinnosuke Nohara, the star of the series.

Mobile phone version
In 2006, Bio Miracle Bokutte Upa was released for mobile phones.

Virtual Console
The Family Computer Disk System version was released on the Wii's Virtual Console in Japan on June 3, 2008, in North America on June 9, 2008, and in Europe on August 29, 2008. The Wii Virtual Console release was the only official release of the game outside Japan.

It was released for the Nintendo 3DS's Virtual Console in Japan on February 19, 2014.

It was also released for the Nintendo Wii U's Virtual Console in Japan on July 15, 2015.

Other appearances
Upa has many guest appearances in other Konami games.

 Wai Wai World 2: SOS!! Parsley Jō (Famicom)
Upa appears as a possible transformation of the main character, the robot Rickle, and plays similarly to how he did in his home game.
 Parodius series
 Fantastic Parodius - Pursue the Glory of the Past (Super Famicom only)
Konami's Parodius series is a cartoonish scrolling shooter with bizarre and nonsensical enemies and theme. In the Super Famicom release of the third title of the Parodius series, a flying version of Upa and his sister Rupa (a pink, palette swapped second player character) appear as space ships with milk bottle missiles. In addition, one level features burrowing through a candy-filled cake similar to the one in Bio Miracle Bokutte Upa.
 Jikkyō Oshaberi ParodiusUpa and Rupa appeared again as playable "space ships" in Konami's surrealist shooter series.
 pop'n music series (Arcade, PlayStation 2)
As of pop'n music 9, Upa appears as a character in the song Bokutte Upa?, a rearrangement of music from his home game. Rupa appears as a palette swap of Upa. Rupa previously appeared as the character for the song TwinBee ~Generation X~, a rearrangement of music from TwinBee, until pop'n music 17 THE MOVIE, where the song received a dedicated TwinBee character.
 Konami Wai Wai World (mobile phone)
In the mobile version that was released in 2006, due to copyright issues, "The Goonies' Mikey's behalf as a character, has appeared with the cake-conscious stage of this work. This version also features S! Applications and BREW versions later.
 Baseball Spirits Series Pro Series Powerful Pro BaseballThe main theme has been included in the creation mode to fight songs of the sample songs and cheering Purosupi Power Pro.
In episode #44 of GameCenter CX (known as Retro Game Master outside Japan), Shinya Arino, the host of the show, played through the Famicom Disk System version of the game and successfully cleared it.Pixel Puzzle Collection''

References

External links

Article from Atari HQ
Nintendo press release from IGN.com

1988 video games
Famicom Disk System games
Konami games
Nintendo Entertainment System games
Mobile games
Video games about children
Video games scored by Kiyohiro Sada
Virtual Console games
Virtual Console games for Wii U
Fantasy video games
Fictional infants
Single-player video games
Video games developed in Japan